Lyrical Law is the eleventh studio album by Canibus released on June 24, 2011 over iTunes. Physical copies were shipped independently from his website, CanibusCatalogue.com, starting July 5, 2011. Buyers of the album had a choice of the LP in a sleeve, jewel case CD, or as an Deluxe LP package. The Deluxe Package included an autographed CD in jewel case and two bonus discs. The first bonus disc features artists from Spitboss on completely new material or remixes of Melatonin Magik as was intended for the original Lyrical Law album. The third and final disc is titled Lyrical Warfare and it was recorded in 1993 by The Heralds of Extreme Metaphors (T.H.E.M.) with Webb between Atlanta and Washington, DC.

Just after CanibusCatalogue.com was up and running, fans were able to pre-order the Lyrical Law LP and could also read a letter from Canibus and view the track listing for the album as well. This track listing featured "Lullaby of Champions" (which was pulled because of the beat sample rights not being approved), "HRSHU Attack", and "U R a Pig" (which were pulled due to squashing the beef with Royce da 5'9"), and were going to be on the physical copies of Lyrical Law. Instead, Canibus replaced these tracks with "Rip vs. Poet Laureate", and "Fight with the Champ".

Track listing

References

2011 albums
Canibus albums